Melicope paniculata, the Lihue melicope, is a rare species of tree in the family Rutaceae. It is endemic to the Hawaiian Islands. Like other Hawaiian Melicope, this species is known as alani.

This tree was until recently thought to be extinct. It was rediscovered in 1997. In 2010 there were an estimated 500 individuals remaining and it was added to the endangered species list of the United States.

The tree is endemic to the island of Kauai, where it grows in wet forest habitat.

References

paniculata
Endemic flora of Hawaii
Biota of Kauai
Taxonomy articles created by Polbot
Critically endangered flora of the United States